State Route 710 (SR 710) is a  state highway in the central portion of the U.S. state of Ohio. The highway ends at a seven-ramp partial cloverleaf interchange with I-270 at its exit 27.

SR 710 was established in 1969.  Although signed as an east–west route, the overall path of this route is that of an irregularly shaped inverted "U", with its westernmost and easternmost portions following north–south roadways.

Route description

The entire length of SR 710 lies within the northern portion of Franklin County, and entirely within the city limits of Columbus. SR 710 starts at SR 161. The first part of SR 710 is located in Busch Boulevard, a north–south road. SR 710's western terminus is located in Busch, a business area. Later, Busch Boulevard ends and SR 710 turns east to Schrock Road and later makes a turn south to Cleveland Avenue, another north–south road. Here, SR 710 makes up the border of Northgate, a residential area. The route ends at a seven-ramp partial cloverleaf interchange with I-270 that features loop ramps in all but the northwestern quadrant.

History

The SR 710 designation was applied in 1969.  Since its inception, it has utilized the same alignment between SR 161 and I-270 in the northern portion of Columbus.

Major intersections

See also

References

External links

710
710
Transportation in Franklin County, Ohio